Junk mail may refer to:
 Advertising mail, the delivery of advertising material to recipients of postal mail
 E-mail spam, the sending of unsolicited bulk messages by email
 Junk Mail (film), Norwegian, 1997
 "The Junk Mail", an episode from the TV series Seinfeld
 Junk Mail (book), 1995, by Will Self

See also